Sir Thomas Munro Gault  (31 October 1938 – 19 May 2015) was a New Zealand jurist. He was a Justice of the Supreme Court of New Zealand and a member of the Privy Council of the United Kingdom as well as a non-permanent judge of the Court of Final Appeal in Hong Kong. He was also a justice of the Supreme Court of Fiji.

Gault attended Wellington College and graduated with a Master of Laws degree from Victoria University of Wellington. After graduation, he was a member of the law firm A J Park & Son for 20 years. In 1981, he began practising as a barrister sole, and in 1984 he was appointed a Queen's Counsel.

His first appointment to the bench was as a Judge of the High Court in 1987, followed three years later by being made a member of the Court of Appeal. He was appointed President of the Court of Appeal in May 2002.

In the 2001 New Year Honours, Gault was appointed a Distinguished Companion of the New Zealand Order of Merit, for services to the judiciary. In the 2009 Special Honours, he accepted re-designation as a Knight Companion of the New Zealand Order of Merit following the restoration of titular honours by the New Zealand government.

A keen golfer, Gault won the New Zealand Universities’ Championship, and was awarded Blues by both Victoria University and the University of New Zealand. Moving into the administration of the game, he was President of the New Zealand Golf Association from 1987 to 1996 and as an Advisory Member of the Rules of Golf and Amateur Status Committees from 1978 to 1996. He was referee for The Open Championship from 1993 to 1998. He joined The Royal and Ancient Golf Club of St Andrews in 1994, and was made its first New Zealand captain in September 2005.

Gault died at home in Auckland in 2015.

References

External links
Supreme Court Judges. Retrieved 7 March 2006.
"First Captain from New Zealand drives in", 22 September 2005.

1938 births
2015 deaths
Court of Appeal of New Zealand judges
People educated at Wellington College (New Zealand)
Golf administrators
High Court of New Zealand judges
20th-century New Zealand judges
Supreme Court of New Zealand judges
Victoria University of Wellington alumni
Justices of the Court of Final Appeal (Hong Kong)
New Zealand judges on the courts of Hong Kong
New Zealand judges on the courts of Fiji
Supreme Court of Fiji justices
Knights Companion of the New Zealand Order of Merit
New Zealand King's Counsel
Members of the Judicial Committee of the Privy Council
People from Wellington City
New Zealand members of the Privy Council of the United Kingdom
21st-century New Zealand lawyers